The city of Aberdeen, Scotland, contains a number of areas and suburbs, some of which are historically separate settlements that have been absorbed by the expanding city.

Airyhall
Altens
Ashgrove
Berryden
Bieldside
Braeside
Bridge of Dee
Bridge of Don
Broomhill
Bucksburn
Cornhill
Countesswells
Cove Bay
Craigiebuckler
Cults
Cummings Park
Danestone
Donside Village
Dyce
Ferryhill
Fittie
Foresterhill
Froghall
Garthdee
Hanover
Hazlehead
Heathryfold
Hilton
Kaimhill
Kincorth
Kingswells
Kittybrewster
Leggart
Mannofield
Mastrick
Middlefield
Midstocket
Milltimber
Nigg
Northfield
Old Aberdeen
Peterculter
Pittodrie
Powis
Queen's Cross
Rosehill
Rosemount
Rubislaw
Ruthrieston
Seafield
Seaton
Sheddocksley
Stockethill
Stoneywood
Summerhill
Sunnybank
Tillydrone
Torry
Tullos
Woodside